Cookstown is a small town in County Tyrone, Northern Ireland. It is the fourth largest town in the county and had a population of 11,599 in the 2011 census. It, along with Magherafelt and Dungannon, is one of the main towns in the Mid-Ulster council area. It was founded around 1620 when the townlands in the area were leased by an English ecclesiastical lawyer, Dr. Alan Cooke, from the Archbishop of Armagh, who had been granted the lands after the Flight of the Earls during the Plantation of Ulster. It was one of the main centres of the linen industry west of the River Bann, and until 1956, the processes of flax spinning, weaving, bleaching and beetling were carried out in the town.

History

In 1609 land was leased to an English ecclesiastical lawyer, Dr Cooke, who fulfilled the covenants entered in the lease by building houses on the land. In 1628, King Charles I granted Letters Patent to Cooke permitting the holding of a twice-weekly market for livestock and flaxen goods.

In 1641, the native Irish revolted against the Planters in a bloody rebellion and the town was destroyed. The rebellion had a devastating effect on the town and development ceased for nearly a century. Over the succeeding years, the lands around Cookstown were progressively bought up by William Stewart of Killymoon until in 1671 all of Dr Cooke's lands were in the hands of the Stewart family. William Stewart and later his son James set out plans for the town soon after this.

In 1802, Colonel William Stewart (James Stewart's unmarried son) approached the London architect, John Nash, and requested that he visit the area to rebuild Killymoon Castle. Nash also designed the Rectory at Lissan for the Rev John Molesworth Staples in 1807.

With the establishment of Gunning's Linen Weaving Mill, with over 300 looms, Cookstown developed in the 19th century as the local centre of the linen trade. Two railways established terminus railway stations at Cookstown - the Belfast and Northern Counties Railway  and the Great Northern Railway.

Prominent developments in the second half of the 19th century included J.J. McCarthy's Church of the Holy Trinity on Chapel Street.

On 17 June 1920, during the Irish War of Independence, the Irish Republican Army (IRA) raided the Royal Irish Constabulary (RIC) barracks in Cookstown, with help from four sympathetic RIC officers. In a brief firefight, IRA volunteer Patrick Loughran was killed. He was the first IRA volunteer killed on active service in what became Northern Ireland.

Cookstown Town Hall was designed by the town surveyor, Charles Geoffrey Birtwell, and built on the Burn Road by James Corrigan of Pomeroy: it was officially opened on 27 May 1953.

During the Troubles, Cookstown suffered from several bomb attacks: on 2 November 1990 an off duty soldier from the Ulster Defence Regiment was killed by a car bomb.

Cookstown Town Hall was demolished in 1998 and the Burnavon Arts and Cultural Centre opened on the site in 2000.

Places of interest
It forms the only remaining part of an early monastery on the site.

Other ancient sites nearby include Beaghmore stone circles and Tullyhogue Fort (beside the village of Tullyhogue), the inauguration site of the chiefs of Tyrone (Tir Eogain), the O'Neills.

The Donaghrisk walled cemetery to the southwest of (and clearly visible from) the fort is the resting place of the O'Hagans, the chief justices of Tyrone (and as such, they presided over the inauguration ceremonies of the O'Neills).

Lissan House lies on the outskirts of Cookstown. It is a large structure which was the home of the Staples family for 350 years.

This structure is regarded as one of Cookstown's finest pieces of architectural heritage. It was built in just over a year at a cost of £80,000 and was Nash's first Irish commission. 

Alexander Richardson, a burgess from Edinburgh, Scotland, bought the estate of Craigbalk in 1617 and built Drum Manor, which was also known Manor Richardson. Alexander's son Sir William Richardson left it to his second son, Alexander, from which the Richardsons of Drum descend. Sir William's third son, William, who inherited lands near Augher, obtained a lease for lands in the townland of Tullyreavy on the Drum Manor estate, where he built a house by the lake known as Oaklands.

St Luaran's Church of Ireland church is on Church Street. 

James Joseph McCarthy's Catholic church, dedicated to the Holy Trinity, was constructed between 1855 and 1860 with a tower and spire at the east end.

Climate

Politics
In elections for the Westminster Parliament and the Northern Ireland Assembly it is part of the Mid Ulster constituency.

The local authority, Cookstown District Council, was established in 1973, and included part of County Londonderry, notably the villages of Moneymore, The Loup and Ballyronan.

As part of the Local Government Reform (NI) Cookstown District Council merged with Dungannon and South Tyrone Borough Council and Magherafelt District Council to form a larger Mid-Ulster District Council in 2015.

Townlands
The following is a list of townlands within Cookstown's urban area, alongside their likely etymologies:
Clare (from Clár meaning "level land")
Cookstown (an English name from Alan Cooke, bishop of Armagh)
Coolkeeghan (from Cúil Caocháin meaning "Keighen's corner")
Coolnafranky (from Cúil na Francaigh meaning "corner of the rats" or "French")
Coolnahavil (from Cúil na hAbhaill meaning "corner of the orchard")
Coolreaghs (from Cúil Riach meaning "grey corner")
Gortalowry (from Gort an Leamhraigh meaning "field of the elm place")
Loy (from Láigh meaning "hill")
Maloon (from Magh Luan meaning "plain of the lambs")
Monrush (from Móin Rois meaning "wooded peatland")
Sullenboy (from Sailean Buí meaning "yellow willows")
Tullagh (from Tulach meaning "hilltop")

Cookstown townland
Cookstown townland itself is situated in the historic barony of Dungannon Upper and the civil parish of Derryloran and covers an area of 217 acres.

The population of the townland increased overall during the 19th century:

Sport
Local association football clubs include Cookstown Olympic F.C. (an intermediate-level football club), Mid-Ulster Ladies F.C. (a women's football club), Killymoon Rangers F.C., Coagh United F.C. and Sofia Farmer F.C. (clubs in the Cookstown District that play in the Ballymena & Provincial Intermediate League).

Cookstown Fr. Rock's, the local Gaelic Athletic Association club, won the All-Ireland Intermediate Club Football Championship in 2013.

Cookstown Hockey Club is the town's field hockey team.

Demography

19th century population
The population of the town increased during the 19th century:

Cookstown is classified as a medium town (i.e. with population between 10,000 and 18,000 people) by the Northern Ireland Statistics and Research Agency (NISRA).

2011 Census
On census day (27 March 2011) there were 11,599 people living in Cookstown. Of these:
98% were from the white ethnic group
56% were from a Catholic background, and 39% were from a Protestant or other Christian background
40% indicated that they had a British national identity, 30% had a Northern Irish national identity, and 28% had an Irish national identity (respondents could choose more than one)

2001 Census
On census day (29 April 2001) there were 10,646 people living in Cookstown. Of these:
26.0% were aged under 16 years and 15.6% were aged 60 and over
49.7% of the population were male and 50.3% were female
52.8% were from a Catholic background and 45.1% were from a Protestant background
3.9% of people aged 16–74 were unemployed.

Education
Secondary schools serving the area include Cookstown High School and Holy Trinity College, Cookstown.

South West College (a technical college) is also in the area.

Healthcare
The first community hub for primary care in the province is to be established in the town, backed by four local GP practices and the health board.  It is to incorporate scanning facilities, a minor surgery suite, a pharmacy, out-of-hours consultations and community healthcare partnerships, with the possibility of developing supported living accommodation for older people.

Notable people
Arts
 Jimmy Cricket - comedian.
 Nick Laird - poet and novelist.
 Eamonn McCrystal - singer and broadcaster.
 Owen O'Neill - writer, actor, director, and comedian.
 Oliver Sheppard (1865-1941) - sculptor, born in Cookstown.
 Jonathan Swift - stayed at Loughry Manor as a guest of the Lindsay family while writing Gulliver's Travels (published in 1726).
 Lias Saoudi - Fat White Family musician, grew up in Cookstown.

Business

 Finbarr O'Neill - former CEO of J.D. Power.

Sport
 Stuart Dallas - footballer, Northern Ireland Team.
 Aaron Hughes - footballer, Northern Ireland Team.
 Owen Mulligan - Tyrone GAA footballer.
Jacqueline Burns - footballer, Northern Ireland women's national football team
David Ames (field hockey) - 2016 Olympian, Great Britain.
Ian Sloan (field hockey) - 2016 Olympian, Great Britain.
Martin Sloan - field hockey, Ireland men's national field hockey team captain of 1990 Men's Hockey World Cup team

Politics
 William Craig - politician, founder of Ulster Vanguard, born in Cookstown.
 Bernadette Devlin - Republican Socialist political activist, raised in a small housing estate called Rathbeg.

Medical
 Major-General Sir Richard Havelock Charles, 1st Baronet (1858–1934) - medical doctor, Serjeant Surgeon to King George V.
 Mary Mallon, aka Typhoid Mary.

See also
Craigballyharky
List of localities in Northern Ireland by population

References

External links

Cookstown District Council website

 
Towns in County Tyrone
Populated places established in 1609
Townlands of County Tyrone
Civil parish of Derryloran
1609 establishments in Ireland
Planned communities in Northern Ireland